Als in een Roes  is a 1986 Dutch film directed by Pim de la Parra.

Plot
The story revolves around a theater group that is looking for a drama to play. The director is thinking to bring his private life on stage. He sees his wife to play the role of prostitute, and sends her to the whores to make the role more into its own again. Finally gets the couple arguing about the classifications, like the other amateurs, who needs to get to stick with their partners. The premiere seems to be in danger.

Cast
 Herbert Flack: Nils Wine
 Liz Snoyink: Tessa Mahon
 Thom Hoffman: Diederik van Avezaat
 Devika Strooker: Esmée
 Leonoor Peacock: Sara Severijn
 Frances Sanders: Sweet
 Eva van Heijningen: Eva Adama
 Miguel Stigter Hero Winter
 Ellen Vogel: Agatha of Avezaat
 Nelly Frijda: Whore
 José Lea: Pianist
 Guikje Roethof: Girl on canal
 Judy Doorman: Fairy with pigeon
 Frans Weisz: Photographer
 Geert Essink: Toneelmeester

External links 
 

Dutch drama films
1986 films
1980s Dutch-language films